Mustafa Al-Salti Al-Karad (born 16 March 1987) is a Syrian-born Qatari handball player for Al Sadd and the Qatari national team.

He competed at the 2016 Summer Olympics.

He also played for Syrian national team from 2006 to 2010.

References

1987 births
Living people
Qatari male handball players
Syrian handball players
Olympic handball players of Qatar
Handball players at the 2016 Summer Olympics
Handball players at the 2006 Asian Games
Naturalised citizens of Qatar
Asian Games competitors for Qatar